Nether Heyford is a village and civil parish in West Northamptonshire, England, close to the M1 motorway and the A5 and A45 roads,  west of Northampton and  northwest of London. The smaller village of Upper Heyford is about half a mile to the north.

Nether Heyford takes its name from 'Hay ford'. Alternatively, 'hedge ford' or enclosure ford'. In 1086, in the Domesday Book, the name is recorded as "Heiforde".  The Post Office once called the village Lower Heyford, but the name was restored to Nether Heyford after reference to it in local deeds. The village is on the flood plain of the River Nene and used to be subjected to flooding, as Watery Lane suggests.

In 1699, a Roman pavement was found in Harestone Meadow to the east of the village.

Facilities
It has one of the largest village greens in the country, two pubs (The Foresters Arms and The Olde Sun), two churches (one Anglican, one Baptist), a purpose-built youth club, park, village hall, hairdresser, butcher and a shop. The extensive playing fields have a cricket club (Heyford CC), a football club (Heyford Athletic), tennis courts and a bowls club.

The Grand Union Canal passes through the village.

Governance
The village has its own parish council, which consists of 11 members who are elected every four years.

History

The Roman period 
The area was occupied during the Roman period and two sites have been discovered (See below)

The 900s

During the 800s, the Danes had made a series of attacks on the Eastern coast of England and gradually progressed inland. In 878, after a series of skirmishes and battles, Alfred the Great, the Saxon King, agreed the Treaty of Wedmore (no document survives), by which the Danes were allowed to settle in that part of England to the North East of Watling Street. They settled in large numbers and many of their village names are characterised by the ending 'by' (farm or village) or 'thorpe' (daughter settlement). Local examples include Long Buckby, Holdenby, Castle Ashby, Kingsthorpe, Rothersthorpe, and Abthorpe. Saxon names are often characterised by 'ton' (house or farm), or 'cot' (hut). Examples are Brington, Gayton, Eastcote, and Dalscote.

Heyford was very much on the border between areas controlled by the Saxons and those controlled by the Danes. In 921, there were further threats of Danish incursion and King Edward gave orders to proceed to Towcester to make ready for defence against possible attack. However the Danes were repelled and during the 900s the Danes and Saxons began to live side by side, mostly living in peace. Whether the inhabitants of Heyford were primarily Saxon or Dane is impossible to know, but they must have been involved to some degree in the skirmishes, the trade, and the subsequent merging of the languages and the two ways of life.

The 1000s

The 1000s began with England still under Saxon rule. But in 1066, William of Normandy became King. Under the Norman administration, Northampton town was becoming an important centre, being central between Winchester (the old capital of Wessex), York, the port of London, and the Welsh borders. At the time of Edward the Confessor there were 60 houses in Northampton. By 1086 there were 300. This period may have marked a process of increased trade and travel through the area.

The landholders in Heyford prior to the Norman Conquest had been Aelid and Wulfstan. With the invasion of William the Conqueror the landholding was transferred to the Bishop of Bayeux, Gilbert of Ghent, and Robert, Count of Mortain, a half brother of King William.

The Domesday Book of 1086 recorded that 'Heiford' consisted of three hides and five virgates of cultivated land. This equates to about 500 acres. There were also nineteen acres of meadow and a mill valued at 16s. There were eight ploughs in use, and the records included mention of 11 villagers, three smallholders, and four slaves.

The 1100s

Little is known of Heyford in the 1100s.

The people of Heyford must have been aware of the development of Northampton and some may have visited Northampton to take part in trade or to witness some of the historical events there.

The 1200s

The 1200s saw the reign of three kings: King John, Henry lll, and Edward l. All of them made regular visits to Northampton and the town continued to flourish.

The 1200s in Heyford saw the building of the Church. The first Rector was Ralph in 1216. It was also a period when ridge and furrow farming was at its peak. There are still several examples existing around the village.

The 1300s

In 1313 John de Pateshull 'levied a fine of a manor' here and in 1316 he was certified to be Lord of the Manor. In 1360 after the death of Sir William de Pateshull the manor was assigned to Catherine, the wife of Sir Robert de Tudenham with whose successors in continued into the 1400s. The original Manor House was at Upper Heyford and its remains can still be seen.

During the 1300s there were a series of crop failures and epidemics of bubonic plague, including the Black Death in 1349 in which around a third of the population died. This depopulated much of the countryside and created the opportunity for some of the more powerful lords and yeomen to take control of larger areas of land. It was during this period that the neighbouring villages of Muscott and Glassthorpe became deserted.

At the same time, there began a growth in sheep farming and many of the former ridge and furrow fields were laid to pasture for grazing. It was because the land was grazed, rather than ploughed, that much of the ridge and furrow survives in recognizable condition today.

The 1400s

Heyford Manor became occupied by the Mauntells. Sir Walter Mauntell died in 1467 during the Wars of the Roses. He was buried in Heyford Church where his tomb remains. It bears portrait brasses of himself and his wife. His monumental brass shows him in armour. He was descended from Michael Mauntell of 'Rode' and married Elizabeth, daughter of John Lumley (also reputed to be of Heyford). In 1477 his son 'John Mauntell levied a fine of the Manor and 35 messuages in fee-simple'.

John Stanbridge was born at Nether Heyford in the late 1400s. He was one of the first men to prepare a book of English grammar to be printed.

The 1500s

The 1500s was the century of Tudor reign, of Henry VIII, Edward VI, Mary I, and Elizabeth I. The prosperity of Northampton had now fallen to an all-time low.

Times were tempestuous for the incumbents of the Manor of Heyford. The Manor continued to be in the hands of the Mauntells. However, in 1541, John Mauntell, "sallying forth in company with his brother-in-law, Lord Dacre, and others on a nocturnal frolic to chase the deer in St Nicholas Pelham's Park in Sussex, encountered three men, one of whom being mortally wounded in the affray. He and his associates were convicted of murder, executed, and their estates escheated to the Crown".

Then in 1553, John's only son Walter "engaged the Kentish insurrection to approve the marriage of Queen Mary, headed by Sir Thomas Wyatt, and was taken prisoner with him, sent to the Tower, and subsequently executed in Kent on 27th Feb, 1553". He lost his estate to the Crown, though the Manor House was kept by the family because John Mauntell had made a settlement of the manor to his wife Anne. Anne took a second husband, Richard Johnson, who together with Francis Morgan, 'serjeant-in-law', 'levied a fine of the three manors of Heyford, Over Heyford, and Nether Heyford, and the Advowson of Nether Heyford.

Then Francis Morgan obtained the 'fee simple' and so the manor passed into the hands of the Morgans. Francis and his wife Anne are buried at Heyford. Francis died in 1558 and the estate passed to his son Thomas. Francis and his wife were buried in the church where their tomb can be seen. It bears a statue of them both with Francis in his judge's robes.

Meanwhile, in 1560, Heyford Grange became occupied by Thomas Judkin. It continued to be occupied by his family until 1925 on the death of Anne Judkin.

The 1600s

Heyford  Parish Church acquired three of its four bells. The first two were installed in 1601, one of which was inscribed 'Thomas Morgan gave me to the Church, frank and free'. A third bell was added in 1638 and a fourth in 1704.

During the 1600s the Manor estates changed hands several times. Thomas Morgan passed them to his daughter, who married Sir John Preston of Furness in Lancashire. From him the estates passed to his brother Sir Thomas Preston. In 1685 he settled the manors of Heyford and Nether Heyford on his daughter Mary, who married William Lord Herbert, son and heir of William, Earl of Powis. However, it is believed that the original Manor House building became derelict during this period. An entry in the Parish Registers of 1652 (during the Commonwealth period) states that the building was unoccupied and 'lying open to vagrants'.

In 1674, William Bliss, a native of Heyford now living in Southwark and trading in wine, endowed, via his will, the village with a sum of £400 to purchase a School House (i.e. school room) and to pay for a School Master. The School was to be free to all children living in the Heyfords and also to any children by the name of Bliss living within 5 miles. The School eventually opened in 1683 with Rev. Gray as School Master.

The 1700s

In contrast with previous times, the eighteenth century was a period when little of historic importance happened in Northampton. Even by 1800 the population was only around 7000 inhabitants. The monarchs during this period were Queen Anne, followed by the first three Georges.

The 1700s was a period of religious turmoil, with struggles between the High Church and non-conformists. In 1789, the Rev Charles Crawley became Rector of Stowe. He and his family ran the churches of Heyford and Stowe under High Church principles. However, he had come to the village at a time when the area was saturated with Protestantism. The Society of Friends, or Quakers, had become established in the late 1600s. Meeting houses were set up in Flore in 1678, and Bugbrooke in 1692. The minutes of these meetings showed that there were regular attendees from Heyford. The Baptist movement was also becoming established. The records of the Castle Hill Baptist Chapel in Northampton also included references to members living in Heyford.

The current Manor House building near the Church is believed to have been built around 1740 by William, the third Marquis of Powis, using stone from the original house at Upper Heyford. In the late 1700s it was occupied by Henry Jephcott, Rector of Heyford. When he died in 1800, the property passed to his daughter Elizabeth and her husband, Rev R B Hughes, Rector of Kislingbury.

In 1750 the enclosure award for Heyford was made and the large open fields were enclosed, creating smaller fields. In 1793, work began on the construction of the Grand Junction Canal, later to become the Grand Union Canal.

The 1800s

This century took us from Georgian to Victorian times. For Heyford it was an era of industrial development. The census of 1801 recorded a population 264 inhabitants. By 1891 it had grown to 750. In the late 1790s the canal had opened up as a means of transport for coal, lime, and bricks. The railway was constructed in the 1830s. These two major developments enabled the movement of coal and iron ore, which in turn allowed the development of the furnaces and the brickworks during the second half or the century. The Furnace Lane area around the canal and railway became a major source of employment for villagers. Further details can be found below.

At the other end of the village, by the river, there was the mill. This was occupied by the Cosford family from the late 1700s until the first world war. The current mill building was constructed in 1821 and later restored & extended in 1881.

Religious struggle continued. The Church in Heyford was run for the entire century by the Crawley family. John Lloyd Crawley was Rector from 1800 until his death in 1850. He was succeeded by his son Thomas until his death in 1897. In 1802 John Lloyd bought the Manor House so he was both Rector and Lord of the Manor. However the Rectory was built in 1851, so his son Thomas lived there instead, and the Manor House remained in the hands of his mother until she died around 1870. After then the Manor House was occupied by a series of different families.

Meanwhile, the non-conformists were also flourishing. The Baptists had been meeting in private houses until 1826 when their Chapel was built at the top of the Green at a cost of £178. The first Methodist Chapel was built in 1838 at the top of Church Street, followed by a new larger one lower down the Street in 1879.

In 1865 a concert was held in the school room 'for the benefit of those who left their homes when on fire'. A poster announced that 'Mr Beaver of Flore (the blind organist) will preside at the harmonium'.

In the 1860s a new house was built for the school master - this is the Laurels in Middle Street between the Playground and the Old Sun. The Education Act of 1870, which required all children to have a basic education meant that a new modern school was required. The current school building was opened on 5 January 1880 as three departments, Infants, Girls, Boys with Henry Smith as Schoolmaster. The Girls & Infants entered by the doorway indicated by the carving above it. The boys entered via the "Boys Entrance", removed in 1911. The boys and birls were not allowed to mix, and there was a six-foot-high wall between the infants'/girls' playground and the boys' playground. Three schoolmasters were sacked during the next 20 years: one for 'playing his flute around the villages', one for 'playing football with the boys' and one for refusing to teach a night school without any extra pay.

The 1900s

The decade began with the Boer war. In 1900 the policeman from Bugbrooke cycled to Heyford to pin the call-up notice on the Parish notice board. The Weedon Barracks was nearby and a number of its reservists lived at Heyford.

It was a decade in which the authority of the village passed from the Church, the School, and Manor House to the Parish Council. Although the Parish Council had been established in the 1890s, following the Local Government Act, it was not until 1901 that the first minutes appeared. The first Clerk was John Dunkley, and the first Chairman was Thomas Faulkner.

It was also a time of sport in the village. The Rev Isham Longden was accredited with founding the cricket club in the early 1900s. Then around 1908, the newly formed 'South Northants Football League' was inaugurated. A meeting was held at the Foresters Arms where it was decided to enter a team into the League and the Heyford Athletic Football Club was formed.

The 1910s

During this decade Mr Cameron was the headmaster, the Rev Isham Longden was the Rector, and Lieut.-Col Livingstone-Learmouth was in residence at the Manor House.

Mr. Cameron is reputed to have enjoyed his beer. It has been said that every lunch time he would send one of the older boys down to the Old Sun to collect his beer. The boys were told to go to the Old Sun via Watery Lane, not via Middle Street, as Mr. Cameron didn't want his wife to see that he was drinking.

On one occasion he was found asleep in the hedge/ditch on the road from Upper to Nether Heyford and he appeared to have been the worst for drink. He was summoned by the Board of Education in Northampton to explain himself. The outcome of the appearance before the Board was that Mr. Cameron was told to "Sign the Pledge" and he was warned that if he was ever in trouble again he would be sacked. He remained as School Master until 1925 when we assume he retired.

In 1911 William Jones became Clerk to the Parish Council, and remained in the post until 1927. Around 1915 John Banner came to the village where he, together with his family took over the running of the mill, until it became derelict in the 1950s.

In 1917 Thomas Faulkner died. He had been an influential; character in the village. He owned the village bake house in Church Street, he was for 50 years the minister at the Methodist Chapel, and he became the first chairman of the Parish Council.

But probably the key influence of this decade was the First World War. While the young men were away, the football and cricket virtually ceased and the pubs were sparsely occupied. The women began going to work in Northampton, some by bike, others by bus. One such place was a munitions factory, which operated on the site of the old Express Lift company. About 20 girls from the village were collected each day and taken by motor bus to work there.

At the outbreak of war in 1914, nineteen lads from the village had travelled to the barracks in Northampton to enlist. More were to follow as they became old enough. By 1918, twenty-three of Heyford's young men had died.

The 1920s

In February 1921 the war memorial was unveiled. The ceremony was performed by Lieut.-Col. Livingstone Learmouth, and the service conducted by Rev Henry Isham Londen.

This was followed by a period of rebuilding village life after the gloomy years of the 1914-18 war. In 1922 a public telephone was installed on the corner of the Green, and the Baptist Chapel School Room was built at a cost of £838. In 1924 gas street lighting was installed and in 1927 an area was set aside on the Green for the children to play on.

According to Kelly's directory of 1920, the publicans were William Ellwood at the Foresters Arms and James Wright at the Old Sun. Amy Eales ran the shop and post office. The farmers in the village were listed as Oliver Adams, Wakefield Whitton, Henry Isham Londen, and John Banner. Early in the 1920s Ernest Humphrey came to the village and began his ladder making business, and in 1928 the Collins family came to Wharf Farm.

In 1925 Anne Judkins died. The Judkins family had been in continuous occupation of Heyford Grange at least since the middle 1500s. Also in 1925 Mr Carrington succeeded Mr Cameron as Headmaster, a post which he held for 22 years.

The 1930s

In 1930 David Browning took over the running of the post office from Amy Eales. He stayed in residence there for more than 20 years. In November of the same year the Heyford WI was formed, its founder members being Mrs Adams, Mrs Punch, and Mrs George. It was in 1938 that the WI first approached the parish council about the possibility of a village hall, but another 20 years were to pass before it was eventually built.

During the 1930s the village took part in some national celebrations. In 1935 the Parish Council organized a public tea for all the parishioners in celebration of the silver jubilee of King George V, and celebrations followed again two years later to commemorate the coronation of King George Vl. Trees were planted on the Green.

In 1939 the parish bought the Roberts Field allotments. In October that year the canal burst its banks at Weedon. This caused the flooding of the river valley and the floodwater spread into the Church Street area. 1939 also saw the outbreak of war, and in September parties of evacuee children began to arrive.

The 1940s

In 1940 the brickworks in Furnace Lane were closed. This was followed soon after by the closure of the Bricklayers Arms on the canal bridge.

The early 1940s marked the sombre war years. Evacuee children began to arrive in the village and at first took their lessons in the Church and Chapel school rooms. Heyford had its own Dad's Army under the leadership of Charlie Highfield. They were the 24th platoon F company of the 11th Northamptonshire Regiment of Home Guards.

In 1941 Albert Garrett became clerk to the parish council, a post which he held until 1975. In 1942 the Rev Isham Longden died aged 82. He had been Rector of Heyford since 1897. In 1947 Mr Woods succeeded Mr Carrington as headmaster.

The later 1940s marked a new postwar era. The Rev Isham Longden had left money in his will to buy a new church bell, and local people raised sufficient funds to buy a second one. This increased the number of bells from four to six, enabling many more combinations of 'changes' to be rung. The bells are still regularly rung today.

In 1947, in recognition of the homecoming of Heyford's demobilized service men, a 'supper and social' was organized by the Parish Council.

Also in 1947 the Women's Branch of the British Legion was formed, and Mrs Nen Blaney became its first president.

The 1950s

In September 1951 the rail crash occurred just outside the Stowe tunnel. 15 people died and 36 were injured. Villagers went to help the casualties. In the same year, the letting of the green for the grazing of cows ceased. In 1952 the mains water and sewage were connected to the village. This marked the end of the need for the four village 'taps' and the Friday night 'toilet cart'. At the request of the British Legion the railings were removed from around the war memorial. 1953 saw the coronation of Queen Elizabeth, and the Parish Council organized the planting of Acacia and May trees along 'Coronation Avenue' between the two halves of the green.

In 1953 George Warr succeeded Mr Woods as headmaster. In 1955 David Browning died and the running of the post office was taken over by his daughter Nen Blaney. In 1958 Vic Watson and his wife Molly took over the butchers and slaughterhouse from Frank Capel.

In 1952 the Heyford Scout Troop was formed by Mr Woods and Bert Wilkinson. They went onto win the soap box derby at Morecambe. In 1955 the cub pack was formed by Bert Wilkinson and George Warr. In 1957 the Darby and Joan club was formed. During the 1950s the Jubilee Hall became unusable as a social meeting place, but in 1958 work began on the construction of the Village Hall.

In 1956 the school became one for infants and juniors only. The seniors had to go to school in Duston. It was another 12 years before Campion School was opened in Bugbrooke.

During the late 1950s construction of the M1 motorway began. Some of its waste was used to fill in the old clay pits at the brickworks. The route of the A45 into Northampton was altered to accommodate the bridge at junction 16, and in 1959 the motorway was opened.

The 1960s

The 1960s was a significant time of change for the village. Much of the old traditional way of life was lost, many new houses were built, the population doubled, bringing many newcomers and a modern village emerged.

In 1960, Coach Bridge was dismantled, the Mill was closed, and the Bugbrooke Gasworks ceased to operate. In 1963 the Methodist Chapel was closed and its few remaining members transferred to the Baptist Chapel.

Meanwhile, there followed a period of rapid development. This decade saw the building of the entire Wilsons Estate, and the complete redevelopment of the Brook Farm and Watery Lane area. In 1965 factory units were built on the site of the old brickworks. In 1967 the old A45 road into Northamtpton was converted to dual carriageway, and in 1968 Campion School in Bugbrooke was opened to accommodate the rapidly increasing number of young people in the area.

All of this brought significant change to the social fabric of the village. In 1960 Mary Warr, a newcomer to the village, was elected the first woman parish councillor.

The growth in population brought much new social life to the village. In May 1960 the Village Hall was officially opened by the Earl Spencer of Althorpe, it was built by village volunteers and not a penny was spent on labour. In 1962 the Gun Club was formed, and in 1965 the Youth Club was opened in the old Methodist Chapel building. In 1969 the Monday Club was formed, and with it came the first Heyford Pantomime. An article about the village in the Mercury and Herald in November 1969 also referred to the Theatre Club, the WEA, the Boy Scouts, the Cubs, the Girls Brigade, the Derby & Joan, and the St John's Ambulance.

In 1968 Major Blaney died. The shop was handed over to Mr & Mrs Eales, and the Post Office was moved next door to be run by Mrs Blaney.

The 1970s

By the early 1970s Heyford had acquired much new housing and many new people. It was perhaps a decade of consolidation as a modern village.

In 1975, ladder making ceased. In 1976 the Jesus Fellowship took over Heyford Hill Fruit Farm, followed soon after by the acquisition of Novelty Farm on the A5.

In 1977 the Charles Crawley festival and pilgrimage took place in memory of all that the Crawley family had done for the church in general, and for Heyford in particular. In November of the same year the first edition of 'the Prattler' appeared under the editorship of Richard Foulkes.

In 1978, after nearly 20 years of absence, the Cricket Club was reformed. Also that year Joan Kirkbride became the first woman chairman of the Parish Council. In 1975 Malcolm Tarbox took over Heyford Meats.

The 1980s

During the 1980s several of the well-known villagers retired. In 1984 Albert Garrett, then aged 76, retired as Clerk to the Parish Council after thirty-five years service. In 1986 Mrs Blaney retired from the Newsagents, and in the same year Bob's Stores closed.

The 1980s also saw a number of improvements to the fabric of the village. In 1985 the Old Sun acquired a restaurant. 1986 saw the opening of the Playing Field and the Patisserie. Also that year the boat yard at High House Wharf was reopened and extensively rebuilt on the site of the old coal yard formerly run by the West brothers. In 1987 the new Youth Club building was built by Ray Wray, and the culvert to prevent flooding was put in place through the centre of the village.

In 1981, for the first and last time, Nether Heyford won the tidy village competition, and in 1988 the village appraisal 'Parish 2000' was conducted by the Parish Council.

The 1990s

The 1990s saw the passing of a number of people who had played a prominent part in village life for much of the twentieth century. This included such people as Reg Collins, Albert Garrett, Nell Bennett (née Browning), Amos Lee, Jack Chapman, Reg Foster, Frank Pearson, Nen Blaney (née Browning), Bill Collins, Fred Browning, Bill Whitton, Bert Wilkinson, Bob Browning, and Ada Smith.

The 1990s also saw the closure of two of the local institutions. The Old Sun Folk Club, which first opened in 1972, was closed in 1991. In 1996, the Monday Club was wound up. It had been set up in 1969 by some of the young wives and mothers new to the village, but after nearly 27 years the wives and mothers were neither young, nor newcomers.

However, during this decade, a number of new activities surfaced. In 1990 the Fishery opened. In 1991 the Heyford Players was born out of the old Monday Club Pantomime group, and in the same year the bowls club was formed. In 1993 the Heyford and Stowe roll of Honour was published, and in 1998 the first of four volumes of 'The Story of Heyford' appeared.

The 1990s also saw a number of further improvements to the fabric of the village. In 1991 the Playing Field Association planted 280 young trees. Also that year the Village Hall was extended. In 1993 the low-cost housing in Robert Field was built. In 1994 the traffic calming scheme was installed, and the play area on the village green was improved.

Newspaper 
The village newspaper called The Prattler is published monthly and delivered to every house in the village.

Notable former residents
 Simon Thomas - Former Blue Peter presenter
 Anil Kumble - Indian cricket legend lived in the village while playing for Northamptonshire CCC
 Andy Faulkner - Actor and voice artist in New Zealand. Grew up in the village

Notable buildings

The Church of St Peter and St Paul
The local church is dedicated to St Peter and St Paul and parts are 13th century. There is a monument to Sir Walter Mauntell (died 1467) and Sir Richard Morgan (died 1556).

Bliss Charity Primary School
The Bliss Charity Primary School has about 148 pupils. It was endowed with income from lands in the will of William Bliss, a wine merchant living in Southwark, who died in 1674. William had been born and brought up in Nether Heyford, later moving to London. In his will, William left £400 to the village, £100 for a schoolhouse and £300 to buy land, the rent from which would pay for the schoolmaster and upkeep of the school.

The Old Rectory
The former rectory is Gothic and ca.1870.

The Manor House
The Manor House is early 18th century.

Nether Heyford Baptist Church
In 1799, a small group of Heyford people first met together regularly for worship in a building belonging to Mr Richard Adams, before a new special place was erected in 1826 and registered as a chapel. In 1805, a Baptist Chapel had been opened in the next village (Bugbrooke) and so Heyford people, until having their own building, would have walked or ridden on horseback to attend services there. Before this time it is known people from Heyford attended Castle Hill Chapel in Northampton.

Thus in 1826 in an era of industrial development in the village between the opening of the canal (1790s) and the construction of the railway (1830s) Baptists were able to establish a presence in Heyford although the link with Bugbrooke remained and the Minister there had charge of both chapels.

By 1839 there were 76 adults in membership. There were also 24 children and therefore a Sunday school was started. The growth continued and when the Jubilee was celebrated in 1876 over 120 children assembled for a hot dinner in Bliss School. Games were organised for the children in Mr Adams Orchard at the rear of the School and later an open-air service was held on the green.

In 1922 Mr Oliver Adams was instrumental in the building of the Schoolroom. The cost was £838 whereas the Chapel in 1826 had cost £178.

Partly with the benefit of a legacy from Mr A T Cosford in 1962, the Heyford Chapel was able to consider a measure of rebuilding and, in calling a part-time Minister became independent.

This was the beginning of the ministry of the Rev Harry Whittaker, better known for his work as the Founder Director of the Northamptonshire Association of Youth Clubs. Between then and 2003 there have only been three other ministers; Revd. Frank Lawes, Revd. Michael Jones and Revd. Roy Cave.

In 1963 the Methodist Chapel, having opened in 1838, was suffering from dwindling numbers and had to close with its remaining few members transferring to the Baptist Chapel. The two stained glass windows which now grace the front of the building were also moved from the Methodist Chapel along with a number of pews and some panelling which was used to create a vestibule.

In 1984 the chapel suffered serious dry rot problems that were simultaneously affecting the Parish Church. This led to a number of united events, mainly involved in money-raising activities.

In the absence of a Minister, the chapel has a number of visiting preachers including Mr Martin Buckby.

The War Memorial
Standing on its own small green in the centre of the village is the War Memorial cross.

Roman villas
The parish is the site of two Roman villas. One was at Whitehall Farm west of the village near the A5 road which closely follows the route of the Roman Road known as Watling Street which ran from London to Holyhead in North Wales. Excavations on the site in 2009 found eight 1,400-year-old skeletons in a burial ground. They could be German mercenaries hired by wealthy land owners to protect their property. Investigations are on-going.

The other site east of the village in Horestone meadow was first discovered in 1699. It had part of a fine floor mosaic, plaster wall fragments and various pottery. In 1821 the building was estimated to be around 100 feet long.

The area of west Northamptonshire is rich in Romano-British archaeology with another villa site and museum at Piddington. The villa site is on a hillside with panoramic view eastwards over the upper valley of the River Nene before it enters the town of Northampton. The whereabouts of the artefacts is not known.

Industrial History 
By 1857 a small ironworks was established called Heyford Ironworks. It was on east of the West Coast Main Line on a piece of land bounded by the railway, the road to Upper Stowe (Furnace Lane) and the canal. It used ore from the Blisworth area mostly, but also for a short time local ore from a quarry on the other side of the railway, a little to the south at Heyford Hills. The ore was possibly transported to the works by horse and cart or by an inclined tramway up to the railway where it would have been tipped into railway wagons for the very short trip to the works. The quarry was in operation from 1863 to 1868. The works closed in the early 1890s.

On the other side of the railway on the north of Furnace Lane a second ironworks was opened in 1866. This was Stowe Ironworks. It closed shortly afterwards but was reconstructed in 1872 and in production from 1873 to 1876 and from 1890 to 1892. In the latter period steel was produced. The ore used came from the Gayton and Blisworth area, from Church Stowe (up until 1876) and possibly from other places. It was connected to the Church Stowe quarries by a standard gauge tramway using horses and from 1869 steam locomotives. This tramway also transported limestone from a quarry at Church Stowe which was used in the iron works and at lime kilns which were also on the site. The kilns were in operation more continuously than the ironworks and carried on until 1900.

In 1920 the site of Stowe Ironworks was purchased by a brick company, and brick manufacture was carried on there until 1940. The clay used came from a claypit a short distance away and was brought by a narrow gauge tramway operated by two geared steam locomotives. The site of the works is now a small industrial estate.

Transport
Bus services in Nether Heyford are provided by Stagecoach Midlands and Uno. The nearest station is in Northampton.

The West Coast Main Line passes to the south and west of the village. Until its closure in 1958, Weedon was the nearest station. The line runs through Stowe Hill tunnel under the A5, to the west.

References

External links

 Whitehall Farm Roman Villa and Landscape Project at Nether Heyford
 Nether Heyford Village Hall
 Nether Heyford Pre-School
 Heyford Athletic Football Club on Pitchero
 Heyford Cricket Club on Pitchero
 Heyford Bowls Club
 Nether Heyford Parish Council

Villages in Northamptonshire
Roman villas in Northamptonshire
West Northamptonshire District
Civil parishes in Northamptonshire